A motel is a hotel designed for motorists.

Motel or The Motel may also refer to:

Geography
 Motel (Schilde), of Mecklenburg-Vorpommern, Germany, tributary of the Schilde
 Motel (Warnow), of Mecklenburg-Vorpommern, Germany, tributary of the Warnow
 Motal, also called Motol or Motele, a township in Belarus
 Saint-Georges-Motel, a commune in the Eure department of France

Arts, entertainment, and media

Films
 The Bag Man, a 2014 thriller film directed by David Grovic that was called Motel in some countries
 Motel (1998 film), a film produced by Nicholas Tabarrok
 The Motel (film), a 2005 film by Michael Kang

Music

Groups
 Motel (band), a Mexican soul-rock band
 Motel (Spanish rock band), a Spanish rock band 
 The Motels, an American new wave band

Albums
 Motel (Banda Uó album), a 2012 album by the Brazilian band Banda Uó
 Motel (Motel album), a 2006 album by the Mexican soul-rock band Motel
 Motel (Pak album), a 2005 album by the New York brutal prog band Pak

Songs
 "Motel" (song), a 1994 song by Japanese duo B'z
 "Motel", a single by Meg Myers, also on Sorry (Meg Myers album)
 "The Motel", a 1995 song by David Bowie on the album Outside

Other uses in arts, entertainment, and media
 Motel (TV series), a 1968-69 Australian television soap opera
 Motel, a character from Fiddler on the Roof